The Mir Yeshiva (Yeshivas Mir), known also as The Mir, is an Orthodox Jewish  yeshiva in Beit Yisrael, Jerusalem. With over 9,000 single and married students, it is the largest yeshiva in the world. Most students are from the United States, United Kingdom and Israel, with many from other parts of the world such as Belgium, France, Mexico, Switzerland, Argentina, Australia, Russia, Canada and Panama.

History
The yeshiva was founded in the small town of Mir (now in Belarus) in 1814, 1815 or 1817 by Rabbi Shmuel Tiktinsky. After his death, his oldest son Rabbi Avraham Tiktinsky was appointed Rosh Yeshiva.  After a number of years, Rabbi Avraham died and his younger brother Rabbi Chaim Leib Tiktinsky succeeded him.  Rabbi Chaim Leib would remain as Rosh Yeshiva for many decades. He was succeeded by his son, Rabbi Avrohom Tiktinsky, who brought Rabbi Eliyahu Boruch Kamai into the yeshiva. In 1903, Rabbi Kamai's daughter married Rabbi Eliezer Yehuda Finkel (Reb Leizer Yudel), son of Rabbi Nosson Tzvi Finkel (the Alter of Slabodka), who in time became the Rosh Yeshiva of the Mir. The yeshiva remained in that location until 1914.

With the outbreak of World War I, the yeshiva moved to Poltava (now in Ukraine). In 1921, the yeshiva moved back to its original facilities in Mir, where it remained until based on secret parts of the Molotov-Ribbentrop Pact, Nazi Germany and the Soviet Union invaded Poland in 1939.

Although many of the foreign-born students left when the Soviet army invaded from the east, the yeshiva continued to operate, albeit on a reduced scale, until the approaching Nazi armies caused the leaders of the yeshiva to move the entire yeshiva community to Keidan, Lithuania. The Yeshiva moved en masse on October 15 to Vilna in order to get out from under Russian rule and into then-free Lithuania.  Russia had announced that it was returning Vilna to Lithuania.  Until that was completed, they could go to Vilna with crossing a border.

Establishment in Jerusalem

Around this time, Rabbi Eliezer Yehuda Finkel traveled to Palestine to obtain visas for his students and reestablish the yeshiva in Eretz Yisrael, but these plans were interrupted by the outbreak of World War II. In 1944, Rabbi Finkel opened a branch of the yeshiva in Jerusalem with ten students, among them Rabbi Yudel Shapiro (later Rosh Kollel Chazon Ish), Rabbi Chaim Brim (later Rosh Yeshiva of Rizhn-Boyan), and Rabbi Chaim Greineman.

In Europe, as the Nazi armies continued to push to the east, the yeshiva students fled to (Japanese-controlled) Shanghai, China, where they remained until the end of the war.

The story of the escape to the Far East of Mir Yeshiva, along with thousands of other Jewish refugees during WWII, thanks largely to visas issued by the Dutch consul Jan Zwartendijk and the Japanese consul-general to Lithuania, Chiune Sugihara, has been the subject of several books and movies including the PBS documentary Conspiracy of Kindness. After the war, most of the Jewish refugees from the Shanghai ghetto left for Palestine and the United States. Among them were survivors from the Mir Yeshiva, many of whom rejoined the yeshiva in Jerusalem. Rabbi Finkel's son, Rabbi Chaim Zev Finkel (commonly called Chazap), served as mashgiach.

When Rabbi Eliezer Yehuda Finkel died on July 19, 1965, his son, Rabbi Beinish Finkel and his brother-in-law, Rabbi Chaim Leib Shmuelevitz became joint Mirrer Rosh Yeshivas. Reb Chaim was considered the main Rosh Yeshiva and when he died, his son-in-law, Rabbi Nachum Partzovitz, replaced him. Rabbi Beinish Finkel became Rosh Yeshiva after Reb Nachum died. With Rabbi Beinish Finkel's death in 1990, the reins were taken over by Rabbi Beinish Finkel's sons-in-law, with the Rosh Yeshiva, Rabbi Nosson Tzvi Finkel, at the helm. After Nosson Tzvi Finkel's sudden death on November 8, 2011, his eldest son, Rabbi Eliezer Yehuda Finkel, was named as his successor.

Chaburas
Under Rabbi Nosson Tzvi Finkel, the yeshiva's enrollment grew into the thousands. The large enrollment was divided into chaburas, or learning groups. Each chabura consists of the same type of student – e.g. American, European, Israeli, Hasidic, and non-Hasidic. These chaburas sit in designated areas in the Mir's various study halls (such as Beis Yishaya, Beis Shalom, and the Merkazei), as well as in the same area in the dining room. Each chabura is subdivided by shiur (class), with each maggid shiur (lecturer) teaching a group of students. The largest shiur in the yeshiva (which is also the biggest in the yeshiva world) is that of Rabbi Asher Arieli, who gives shiurim in Yiddish to approximately 700 students. In 2019 All Hasidic boys where transferred to a single study hall in the Pinsk Synagogue .

Mir Brachfeld

The yeshiva has a branch in Modi'in Illit primarily for Israelis, which also includes a kollel. Mir Brachfeld was headed by Rabbi Aryeh Finkel  (grandson of Rabbi Eliezer Yehuda Finkel and son of Rabbi Chaim Zev Finkel) until his passing on Aug. 9, 2016. His oldest son, Rabbi Binyomin Finkel, took over as Rosh Yeshiva.

Present leadership 
 Harav Eliezer Yehuda Finkel, Rosh Yeshiva, 2011–Present; (Harav Harav Nosson Tzvi Finkel's son)
Harav Binyomin Finkel, Mashgiach;   (Harav Aryeh Finkel's son)
Harav Yitzchok Ezrachi, Rosh Yeshiva;   (Harav Chaim Leib Shmuelevitz's son-in-law)
 Harav Binyomin Carlebach, Associate Rosh Yeshiva;  (Harav Binyomin Beinush Finkel's son-in-law)
 Harav Nachman Levovitz, Associate Rosh Yeshiva;  (Harav Binyomin Beinush Finkel's son-in-law)
Harav Binyamin Gellis, Associate Rosh Yeshiva; (Harav Shuie Gellis's son)
  Harav Yisroel Glustein, Associate Rosh Yeshiva;  (Harav Binyomin Beinush Finkel's son-in-law)
 Harav Asher Arieli, gives the largest Shiur in Mir Jerusalem.
Mr. Adrian Garbacz, CEO of American Friends of Yeshiva D'Mir

Past leadership 
 Rabbi Eliezer Yehuda Finkel, Rosh Yeshiva, 1917-1965; (Nosson Tzvi Finkel/The Alter of Slabodka's son and Eliyahu Boruch Kamai's son-in-law)
 Rabbi Chaim Leib Shmuelevitz, Rosh Yeshiva, 1941-1979
 Rabbi Nochum Partzovitz, Rosh Yeshiva, 1979-1986; (Chaim Leib Shmuelevitz's son-in-law)
 Rabbi Binyomin Beinush Finkel, Rosh Yeshiva, 1979 - 1990; (Eliezer Yehuda Finkel's son)
 Rabbi Nosson Tzvi Finkel, Rosh Yeshiva, 1990 - 2011;  (Binyomin Beinush Finkel's cousin and son-in-law)
 Rabbi Aryeh Finkel, Mashgiach, ? - 2016; (son of Chaim Zev Finkel, Mashgiach ruchani)
 Rabbi Eliyahu Boruch Finkel, Maggid Shiur, ? - 2008;  (Eliezer Yehuda Finkel's grandson)
 Rabbi Refoel Shmuelevitz, (son of Chaim Leib Shmuelevitz), Rosh Yeshiva, 1990-2016
Harav Aharon Chodosh, Mashgiach Ruchani, (Harav Chaim Zev Finkel's son-in-law), 2020

Notable alumni

 Moses Michael Levi Barrow (born Jamal Michael Barrow; 1978), better known by his stage name Shyne, Belizean rapper and politician
 Rabbi Yitzchak Berkovits, Rosh Kollel, Linus HaTzedek: Center for Jewish Values
 Ari Goldwag, singer-songwriter
 Aryeh Kaplan, philosopher
 Shulem Lemmer (born 1990), singer
 Baruch Levine, singer-songwriter
 David Lichtenstein
 Shlomo Yehuda Rechnitz
 Rabbi Jacob J. Schacter, rabbi and historian

See also
Mir Yeshiva (Belarus)

References

Bibliography
Toldot Yeshivat Mir, Zinowitz, M., Tel Aviv, 1981.

External links

 The Mir Yerushalayim Website
 Reeva Kimble's "Brief History of the Jews of Mir"
 "Moving Plea by HaRav Nosson Tzvi Finkel to Get Rid of Cell Phones"
 The Mir Yeshiva before the Holocaust - Yad Vashem website

Ashkenazi Jewish culture in Jerusalem
Belarusian-Jewish culture in Israel
Orthodox yeshivas in Jerusalem
Educational institutions established in 1944
1944 establishments in Mandatory Palestine
Jewish seminaries
Mir Yeshiva